The Mercer Family Foundation is a private grant-making foundation in the United States. As of 2013, it had $37 million in assets. The foundation is run by Rebekah Mercer, the daughter of computer scientist and hedge fund manager Robert Mercer.

Under Rebekah’s leadership, the family foundation invested about $70 million into conservative causes between 2009 and 2014. The foundation has also donated to groups that reject the scientific consensus on climate change.

Activities
The foundation's main interests are in the fields of public policy, higher education, and science. The foundation has donated to organizations and institutions including the Heritage Foundation, Illinois Policy Institute, Heartland Institute, and SUNY Stony Brook. Mercer provides funding to the Home Depot Foundation, whose mission is to "improve the homes and lives of U.S. military veterans and their families."

The Mercer Family Foundation has lobbied against efforts to fully fund the Internal Revenue Service.

The organization has been linked to the funding of Donald Trump and other US far-right entities. Similar allegations have been made about links to members of the UK government.

References

Political and economic research foundations in the United States
Non-profit organizations based in New York City
Climate change denial
Conservative organizations in the United States